Choppington railway station served the village of Choppington, Northumberland, England from 1858 to 1964 on the Blyth and Tyne Railway.

History 
The station opened on 1 April 1858 by the Blyth and Tyne Railway. It was situated on the A1068 west of the level crossing. There were two sidings that entered from the west; they were located behind the platforms and they served a brickworks. These were removed by 1922. The station was closed to passengers on 3 April 1950, although there was an excursion to and from Bellingham that ran on 22 September 1962. The station was closed to goods traffic on 9 March 1964.

References

External links 

Disused railway stations in Northumberland
Former North Eastern Railway (UK) stations
Railway stations in Great Britain opened in 1858
Railway stations in Great Britain closed in 1950
1858 establishments in England
1964 disestablishments in England
railway station